Ehud Gol (Hebrew: אהוד גול; born 1946, in Jerusalem) is an Israeli diplomat.

Education
From 1969 until 1971, Gol studied at Hebrew University of Jerusalem in 1969–1971, earning a BA in International Relations and Political Science. In 1973–1975, he studied American Studies at New York University.

Diplomatic career
He served as ambassador to Italy (while concurrently serving to FAO, WFP & IFAD), Malta,  San Marino, Spain, Andorra, Albania, Portugal, Tajikistan, Turkmenistan, and as the Consul General to Rio de Janeiro.

References

External links
Portugal protests Israeli diplomat’s criticism of Hitler tribute
Lisbon to summon Israel envoy for criticizing Mottaki visit

1946 births
Israeli consuls
Ambassadors of Israel to Albania
Ambassadors of Israel to Spain
Ambassadors of Israel to Andorra
Ambassadors of Israel to Armenia
Ambassadors of Israel to Italy
Ambassadors of Israel to Malta
Ambassadors of Israel to San Marino
Ambassadors of Israel to Portugal
Ambassadors of Israel to Tajikistan
Ambassadors of Israel to Turkmenistan
Hebrew University of Jerusalem Faculty of Social Sciences alumni
New York University alumni
Living people